Michael Jay Snarskis (April 12, 1945 – January 24, 2011) was an American archeologist who founded the scientific study of archaeology in Costa Rica. At that time, almost all artifacts available to collectors were shorn of their provenance and historical significance by huaquero looters, whom Snarskis described as "the tomb-robbers ... who have [made] such studies more difficult."

Early life and education

Michael Snarskis was born in Davenport, Iowa, on April 12, 1945, the son of Edward and Alice Cressey Snarskis.  He attended Washington Senior High School in Cedar Rapids, then State University of Iowa (1963–1964) and Yale University (1964–1967), majoring in Spanish. After one year of law school, Snarskis joined the Peace Corps, serving in Costa Rica. His interest in archeology awakened in Costa Rica, and on his return he studied archeology at Columbia University. After three years of field work in Costa Rica, he received his Ph.D. in 1978 with a dissertation on The Archaeology of the Central Atlantic Watershed of Costa Rica.

Career

When Snarskis received his Ph.D. in 1978, there was almost no scientific archeology in Costa Rica. 
Snarskis founded the Archeology Department at the Museo Nacional de Costa Rica in San José, Costa Rica, and directed it for 10 years, hiring the first Costa Rican archeology students to work there. He became a professor of archaeology at the Universidad de Costa Rica, remaining there for 14 years. As an archeologist and conservationist, Snarskis worked for the Tayutic Foundation, which seeks to preserve and explore the Guayabo National Monument. The Jade Museum and the Gold Museum, both in San José, Costa Rica, had Snarskis as their technical advisor.

Snarskis founded and edited VÍNCULOS: Revisita de Antropologia del Museo Nacional de Costa Rica, a professional journal that won awards for scientific excellence and which continues to be published today, one of the longest runs for a scientific journal in Latin America.

From 1986 to 1997 Snarskis took on an international mission job as chief editor and head of publications for the Inter-American Institute for Cooperation on Agriculture (IICA).

Michael Snarskis died quietly, apparently while reading a book, at his home in Costa Rica on January 24, 2011.

Contributions to Pre-Columbian archaeology

Highlights of excavation projects directed by Snarskis include

 Discovery of the first Paleoindian quarry and workshop site some 12,000 years old, first of its kind known, and with both Clovis and fishtail fluted spear points, diagnostic of Paleoindian hunters in North and South America respectively.
 The oldest known pottery in the country, two very different complexes from around 2000 BC
 The first clear house foundations found in the lowland Caribbean rain forest, from about the first century AD.
 An extraordinary 33 cm Olmec jade clamshell pendant, found just 15 minutes away from the National Museum in a San José suburb, one of the best Olmec jades known, and evidence of ancient long-distance trade with Mesoamerica.
 Several effigy vessels of Usulatan pottery made in El Salvador, along with many other local high status ceramics and 65 jade pendants in a burial ground on a high terrace overlooking the Pacific

The overlapping of northern (Mesoamerican) and southern (northern South American) cultural spheres of influence revealed by Snarskis's work make Costa Rican archaeology remarkably rich and varied, and of great importance for understanding cultural diffusion in the region.

Publications

 La Ceramica Precolombina en Costa Rica = [Pre-Columbian Ceramics in Costa Rica] by Michael J. Snarskis 1982
 "Central America: the Lower Caribbean", in The Archaeology of Lower Central America, Lange, F. W. and Stone, D. Z., Eds., University of New Mexico Press, Albuquerque, 1984.
 The Archaeology of Costa Rica". In Between Continents/Between Seas: Precolumbian Art of Costa Rica, pp. 15–84. Harry N. Abrams, Inc. New York, 1981
 The Archaeology of Costa Rica, ArqueoCostaRica, the online journal of Costa Rican Archaeology
 Costa Rica 10,000 Years Ago: Evidence of the Earliest Known Peoples, by Michael J. Snarskis, ArqueoCostaRica.net Website
 The First Farmers in Costa Rica: Tropical Archaic Period in Lower Central America, by Michael J. Snarskis
 Costa Rica's First Potters: The Earliest Known Archaeological Ceramics, by Michael J. Snarskis
 The Rise of Chiefdoms: A Surge in Population and Complexity in Pre-Columbian Costa Rica, by Michael J. Snarskis
 The Rise of Chiefdoms, Part II: Symbols of Power, Status and Wealth in Pre-Columbian Costa Rica, by Michael J. Snarskis
 Archaeologists and Huaqueros, by Michael J. Snarskis
 "Turrialba: A Paleo-Indian Quarry and Workshop Site in Eastern Costa Rica" in American Antiquity, Vol. 44, No. 1, 1979, by Michael J. Snarskis
 "From Jade to Gold in Costa Rica: How, Why, and When", by Michael J. Snarskis. In Gold and Power in Ancient Costa Rica, Panama, and Colombia, Jeffrey Quilter and John W. Hoopes, Editors

See also

 List of museums in Costa Rica
 Costa Rica: Pre-Columbian Period
 Isthmo-Colombian
 Guayabo de Turrialba
 Stone spheres of Costa Rica
 Grave robbery
 Metate

References

External links
 ArchaeoCostaRica.com "A Costa Rica Archaeology Site" By Michael J. Snarskis, Ph.D.
 Fundacion Ayutic
Jade in ancient Costa Rica, a 1998 exhibition catalog from the Metropolitan Museum of Art libraries (see his essay: The Imagery and Symbolism of Precolumbian Jade in Costa Rica)

American archaeologists
1945 births
2011 deaths
University of Iowa alumni
Yale University alumni
People from Davenport, Iowa
Peace Corps volunteers